EB Garamond is a free and open source implementation of Claude Garamond’s typeface, Garamond, and the matching Italic, Greek and Cyrillic characters designed by Robert Granjon. Its name is shortening of Egenolff–Berner Garamond which refers to the fact that the letter forms are taken from the Egenolff–Berner specimen printed in 1592.

Implementation history 

In 2011 the Austrian designer Georg Mayr-Duffner released the EB Garamond under the Open Font License.
Mayr-Duffner took the letterforms from a scan of a specimen known as the “Berner specimen” which was printed in 1592 by Conrad Berner, son-in-law of Christian Egenolff and his successor at the Egenolff print office. It shows Garamont's roman and Granjon's italic fonts at different sizes. The Greek characters  are based on Robert Granjon's work as well. In addition the font includes OpenType features such as swash italic capitals and schoolbook alternates. Duffner's intention was to include multiple optical sizes. As of 2014 his implementation included fonts based on the 8 and 12 point forms from the 1592 specimen, but lacked the bold font faces. As Georg Mayr-Duffner couldn't complete the bold weights for personal reasons, Google commissioned the Spanish type designer Octavio Pardo to continue the project. As of 2018 Pardo's implementation includes 5 weights (Regular, Medium, Semi-Bold, Bold and Extra-Bold), both in regular and italic style.

Technical details
Mayr-Duffner implemented the EB Garamond originally in FontForge using the SFDIR and UFO format. Octavio Pardo switched to the proprietary font editor Glyphs that supports multiple master fonts. Pardo's implementation is hence based on two masters, Regular and Bold. The other weights are generated from the masters. The letter forms and the kerning of Pardo's Regular are identical with Mayr-Duffner's EB Garamond 12. The source of the fonts is drawn with cubic Bézier curves, thus the OTF-version (CFF-style) version of the compiled fonts should be preferred over the TTF-version, as TTF requires quadratic Bézier curves which have to be generated by lossy conversion during the compilation from the source files.

EBGaramond-Maths
EBGaramond-Maths is a package for LaTeX that provides a version of the EB Garamond 12 for mathematics. Its maintainer is Clea F. Rees.

Garamond-Math
Garamond-Math is an additional OpenType font file for the EB Garamond family containing symbols for mathematics. The file is provided by Yuansheng Zhao.

OpenType features 

As of 2018, EB Garamond includes the following OpenType features:

The feature list and additional information can be obtained by tools like otfinfo (e.g. otfinfo -f `kpsewhich EBGaramond-Regular.otf`) or FontDrop!.

Reception 
The prominent typeface designer Erik Spiekermann described the EB Garamond as “one of the best open source fonts”.

Availability

Web 
 Georg Mayr-Duffner's implementation lacking the bold faces is available from his GitHub repository. It is still possible to generate font files from that repository using OpenBSD or Linux.
 Octavio Pardo's newer version can be downloaded as OTF and TTF files from his repository.
 Pardo's version is also available for embedding through Google Fonts and through Adobe Fonts.

LaTeX

As Classic LaTeX font
EB Garamond is also distributed via the CTAN mirrors as LaTeX font package. Therefore, it can be easily applied to LaTeX based documents by adding \usepackage{ebgaramond} to the document preamble. Unfortunately the classic LaTeX font system cannot make use of all characters and OpenType features offered by EB Garamond, but this can be solved by using the XeTeX smartfont subsystem.

Through XeTeX
Nowadays LaTeX supports the 3 smartfont technologies OpenType, AAT and Graphite directly through XeTeX, which has to be activated in one's LaTeX editor. Using the editor LyX, this can be done by checking a box under LyX > Document > Settings > […] use XeTeX. This means adding \use_non_tex_fonts true to the header of the .lyx document files. Then all OpenType, AAT and Graphite fonts installed locally on your OS can be used directly.

In order to access the smart font features of EB Garamond, some code has to be added to the document preamble. E.g. to set EB Garamond as the document main font using old style figures and the OpenType Stylistic Set 6 (long-tailed Q), the following code can be used:
\usepackage{fontspec}
\setmainfont{EB Garamond}[Numbers={OldStyle;Proportional},RawFeature={+ss06}]
Another method to achieve the same result is the following specification:
\usepackage{fontspec}
\setmainfont{EB Garamond}[RawFeature={+onum;+pnum;+ss06}]

References

Latin-script typefaces
Greek typefaces
Cyrillic typefaces
IPA typefaces
Typefaces with optical sizes
Typefaces with text figures
Free software Unicode typefaces
Typefaces and fonts introduced in 2011